Line 1 of Kunming Metro is a rapid transit line connecting Chenggong District with Kunming's urban center. The line started operation on 20 May 2013. Line 1's color is  red. Currently, through service is provided between Line 2 and this line, meaning passengers from/to Line 2 do not need to transfer at South Ring Road station. Nevertheless, once Line 1 Northwestern extension and Line 2 Phase 2 are completed, this line will be separated from Line 2, and South Ring Road station will become an interchange station.

Hours of operation
Since 2013, the operation hours for line 1, from 6:00 AM to 12:00 midnight daily with an 8 minutes interval frequency.

On the initial operation one-way trip will take approximately 34 minutes.

Opening timeline

Stations

References 

01
Railway lines opened in 2013
2013 establishments in China